In mathematics, the Arakawa–Kaneko zeta function is a generalisation of the Riemann zeta function which generates special values of the polylogarithm function.

Definition
The zeta function  is defined by

where Lik is the k-th polylogarithm

Properties

The special case k = 1 gives  where  is the Riemann zeta-function.

The special case s = 1 remarkably also gives  where  is the Riemann zeta-function.

The values at integers are related to multiple zeta function values by

where

References
 
 
 

Zeta and L-functions